Grant Bowler (born 18 July 1968) is a New Zealand-Australian actor and television presenter who has worked in American, Australian, New Zealand, and Canadian film, television, and theatre.

He is known for playing the role of Constable Wayne Patterson in Blue Heelers and Wolfgang West in Outrageous Fortune. He also appeared as Wilhelmina Slater's love interest Connor Owens in Ugly Betty. He starred as Joshua Nolan on the Syfy television series Defiance.

As a presenter, he was best known for hosting reality game shows – including The Mole Australia and The Amazing Race Australia, both of which aired on the Seven Network.

Bowler has been the voiceover for Border Security: Australia  for the Seven Network since 2004. He has also provided the voiceover for the Canadian version of the show and the American version of the show when those version screen in Australia & New Zealand as Border Security: International, which often air on 7two.

Personal life 
Bowler was born in Auckland, New Zealand, but moved to Australia when he was young, and was raised in Brisbane.

In 2011, he separated from his wife of nine years, Australian actress Roxane Wilson, with whom he has two children.

Career 
Bowler is a graduate of the National Institute of Dramatic Art.

He worked extensively in theatre with the Bell Shakespeare Company touring with the original company founded by John Bell.

His first television role was as Constable Wayne Patterson on Blue Heelers, from 1993 to 1996. After leaving that show, he spent time on Pacific Drive in 1996 and Medivac from 1996 to 1998. He had recurring roles on Always Greener and Stingers, starred in the television adaptation of On the Beach, spent a year on the ABC series Something in the Air, and starred in the 2004 miniseries Through My Eyes about the disappearance of Azaria Chamberlain. Bowler had a recurring role on All Saints from 2004 to 2005.

Bowler also hosted the Australian version of The Mole, hosting the show from 2000 to 2003. He was replaced as host on the 2005 series by Tom Williams because of family commitments and hosting duties with Border Security.

Bowler serves as the narrator of the reality show Border Security: Australia's Front Line, a duty which he began as host in 2004, though he stopped appearing on camera after the first season. Bowler starred in the New Zealand series Outrageous Fortune. Bowler's acting career has developed since he first began playing Wolf, but although the character is not in every episode, he has turned down other roles to continue in Outrageous Fortune.

Starting with the season four episode "Ji Yeon", Bowler plays the guest role of Captain Gault, the captain of a freighter on the popular American television series Lost.

In 2008, he became a recurring regular on Ugly Betty, in which he played the corrupt CFO of Meade Publications (Connor Owens) who romanced the series' main villain Wilhelmina Slater. Bowler said of his character, "He's got a lot of evil secrets." In December 2009, he was cast in the role of Cooter, a werewolf, in the HBO urban fantasy series True Blood, for that show's third season.

In late 2010, he was announced as the host of Seven Network's The Amazing Race Australia and hosted the show for 3 seasons. He did not return to host for the 2019 Network 10 revival of the series, being replaced by Beau Ryan.

He played Hank Rearden in Atlas Shrugged: Part I (2011), the first part of a planned three-part film adaptation of Ayn Rand's novel of the same name. He was also seen in 2011 in The City of Gardens, as well as the film Killer Elite.

In 2012, Bowler was cast as Richard Burton opposite Lindsay Lohan as Elizabeth Taylor in the biographical TV-movie  Liz & Dick for Lifetime in the US.

He was seen in the war drama Gallipoli, released in 2015 on Channel 9, Australia. Bowler was also seen in the psychological action film Swelter, alongside Jean-Claude Van Damme and Alfred Molina, in the sci-fi thriller 400 Days with Brandon Routh and Dane Cook, Lucky Dog with Amy Smart, and the family movie, Zooey to the Max.

In 2020, Bowler appeared in a recurring role in The Baker and the Beauty playing the Australian father of lead character Noa Hamilton, played by Nathalie Kelley.

Filmography

Film

Television

Video games

References

External links 

Outrageous Fortune Official site
Sue Barnett & Associates | Grant Bowler

Living people
Australian male film actors
New Zealand male film actors
1968 births
Australian male television actors
New Zealand male television actors
New Zealand emigrants to Australia
20th-century Australian male actors
21st-century Australian male actors
People from Auckland
Male actors from Sydney
People from Brisbane
People from Perth, Western Australia